Eastlawn Memorial Gardens (a.k.a. City of Lubbock Cemetery) is a cemetery in Lubbock, Texas housing over 60,000 graves.

Notable burials
 George Andrew Davis Jr., Korean War Congressional Medal of Honor Recipient
 Buddy Holly, musician
 Virgil Johnson,  singer
 Bobby Layne, Hall of Fame Professional football player

References

External links
 

Cemeteries in Texas
Lubbock, Texas